Josiah Wolf is a drummer and vocalist from Cincinnati, Ohio. He is best known as the drummer, percussionist, and backing vocalist of the indie rock band Why?, of which his brother Yoni is the lead vocalist.

History
Josiah Wolf has been a member of Why? since 2005.

His solo debut album, Jet Lag, was released on Anticon in 2010. He toured the United States in promotion of the album.

Discography

Albums
 Jet Lag (2010)

EPs
 The Josiah EP (2003)

Why?
 Elephant Eyelash (2005)
 Alopecia (2008)
 Eskimo Snow (2009)
 Mumps, Etc. (2012)
 Moh Lhean (2017)

Contributions
 Clouddead - "JimmyBreeze" from Clouddead (2001)
 Clouddead - "Dead Dogs Two" from Ten (2004)
 Jel - "All Day Breakfast" from Soft Money (2006)

References

Anticon
American indie rock musicians
American multi-instrumentalists
Year of birth missing (living people)
Living people